Bodkovci is a settlement in the Slovene Hills in the Municipality of Juršinci in northeastern Slovenia. The area is part of the traditional region of Styria. It is now included with the rest of the municipality in the Drava Statistical Region.

Notable people
Notable people that were born in Bodkovci include:
Anton Slodnjak (1899–1983), Slavic specialist and literary historian

References

External links
Bodkovci on Geopedia

Populated places in the Municipality of Juršinci